Andreas Stadler (31 July 1896 – 14 February 1941) was an Austrian weightlifter who competed in the 1924 Summer Olympics and in the 1928 Summer Olympics. In 1924 he won the silver medal in the featherweight class. Four years later at the 1928 Games he finished sixth in the featherweight class.

References

External links
 

1896 births
1941 deaths
Austrian male weightlifters
Olympic weightlifters of Austria
Olympic silver medalists for Austria
Olympic medalists in weightlifting
Medalists at the 1924 Summer Olympics
Weightlifters at the 1924 Summer Olympics
Weightlifters at the 1928 Summer Olympics
World record setters in weightlifting
20th-century Austrian people